State Route 116 (SR-116) is a  long state highway in the U.S. state of Utah. Located entirely within Sanpete County, the route runs from SR-132 in Moroni to U.S. Route 89 in Mount Pleasant.

Route description 
SR-116 begins at an intersection with SR-132 in eastern Moroni. It serves as a continuation of Main Street as it exits Moroni. The route then turns northeast with farmland to the south and desert to the north. Turning back east, SR-116 crosses the San Pitch River, fields begin to appear north of the route. The highway then enters Mount Pleasant, taking on the name of Main Street and ending at US-89 in the center of the city.

History
State Route 116 was first added to the state highway system in 1931, consisting of the current alignment but extending farther to the west through Moroni to the forest boundary at Maple Canyon. In 1933, the route was extended further west to the forks of Maple Canyon. In 1969, the route was truncated at its western end, relinquishing the roadway west of Moroni back to local jurisdiction, resulting in the present-day alignment.

Major intersections

References 

116
 116